The Count of Monte Cristo is a lost 1912 unauthorised silent film short directed by Colin Campbell and starring Hobart Bosworth. The film is a remake of the same story Selig had filmed in 1908. When this film was made Adolph Zukor had secured the rights to the 1844 novel and was about to release his 1913 version with James O'Neill who had made the role famous on stage. Zukor's attorneys ordered this film destroyed and all prints were withdrawn.

Cast
Hobart Bosworth - Edmond Dantes
Tom Santschi - Danglars (*as William T. Santshi)
Herbert Rawlinson - Caderouse
Eugenie Besserer - Mercedes
William Duncan
James Robert Chandler - Captain LeClerc (*as Robert Chandler)
George Hernandez - Napoleon
Nick Cogley - Morrell (*as Nicholas Cogley)
William Hutchison - M. Dantes (*as William Hutchinson)
Roy Watson - Villefort
Frank Clark - Nortier
Fred Huntley - Abbe Faria (*as Fred Huntly)
Bessie Eyton - Haidee
Lillian Hayward - Carconte
Al Ernest Garcia - Fernand (*as Al E. Garcia)
Alvin Wyckoff

References

External links
 Monte Cristo at IMDb.com

1912 films
1912 adventure films
American adventure films
American silent short films
Films directed by Colin Campbell
Films based on The Count of Monte Cristo
Lost American films
American black-and-white films
Depictions of Napoleon on film
Selig Polyscope Company films
1910s American films
Silent adventure films
1910s English-language films